Brother Jack at the Jazz Workshop Live! is a live album by organist Jack McDuff recorded in San Francisco in 1963 and released on the Prestige label.

Reception

Allmusic awarded the album 3 stars and its review by Stewart Mason states, "McDuff is firmly in control of the set all the way. His organ playing can seem almost clichéd to the soul-jazz novice, until one realizes that these riffs became soul-jazz clichés because so many lesser players immediately copped his licks. Here, one can hear them from the source, and it's an eye-opening experience".

Track listing 
All compositions by Jack McDuff except as indicated
 "Blues 1 & 8" - 7:06  
 "Passing Through" (Charles Lloyd) - 2:39  
 "Dink's Blues" - 6:19  
 "Grease Monkey" - 2:32  
 "Vas Dis" - 8:09  
 "Somewhere in the Night" (Billy May) - 3:55  
 "Jive Samba" (Nat Adderley) - 6:50

Personnel 
Jack McDuff - organ
Red Holloway - tenor saxophone, soprano saxophone
Harold Vick - tenor saxophone, flute 
George Benson - guitar
Joe Dukes - drums

References 

 
Jack McDuff live albums
1963 live albums
Prestige Records live albums
Albums recorded at the Jazz Workshop